Noa Fjelddahl (born 28 May 2003) is a Hong Kong professional footballer of partial Norwegian descent who is currently a free agent.

Career statistics

Club

Notes

References

External links
 Yau Yee Football League profile

Living people
2003 births
Hong Kong footballers
Norwegian footballers
Association football forwards
Hong Kong Premier League players
Hong Kong FC players